The following is a list of episodes for the television series Tales from the Crypt, which aired from 1989–1996 for seven seasons. There were a total of 93 episodes and three feature-length films.

Series overview

Episodes

Season 1 (1989)

Season 2 (1990)

Season 3 (1991)
{{Episode table |background=#9c2241|overall=4 |season=4 |title=17 |aux1=16 |aux1T=Source|director=14 |writer=14 |airdate=12 |episodes=

{{Episode list
| EpisodeNumber   = 37
| EpisodeNumber2  = 13
| Title           = Spoiled
| Aux1            = Haunt of Fear #26
| DirectedBy      = Andy Wolk
| WrittenBy       = Connie Johnson
| OriginalAirDate = 
| ShortSummary    = In a meta-layered spoof of daytime soap operas, Janet (Faye Grant), a housewife who is obsessed with the soap opera There's Always Tomorrow  and watches the program religiously, is annoyed that her doctor husband, Leon (Alan Rachins), is more obsessed with experimenting on a rabbit than spending time with her. When her TV loses picture at a crucial moment in the show, Janet calls in a cable man named Abel (Anthony LaPaglia), to have cable installed. Inspired by There's Always Tomorrow'''s no-nonsense main character, Fuschia Monroe (Anita Morris), Janet begins a steamy affair with Abel while Leon is distracted with his work. When Leon catches the two of them in the act, he soon wonders if he could try his experiment on human subjects.
| LineColor       = 9c2241
}}

}}

Season 4 (1992)

Season 5 (1993)

Season 6 (1994–95)

Season 7 (1996)

 Films Tales from the Crypt Presents: Demon KnightTales from the Crypt Presents: Bordello of BloodTales from the Crypt Presents: Ritual''

References

External links 
 
 

Lists of anthology television series episodes
Lists of American horror-supernatural television series episodes
Tales from the Crypt